Les Nunn (born 25 January 1942) is an Australian water polo player. He competed at the 1964 Summer Olympics and the 1972 Summer Olympics. In 2011, he was inducted into the Water Polo Australia Hall of Fame.

References

External links
 

1942 births
Living people
Australian male water polo players
Olympic water polo players of Australia
Water polo players at the 1964 Summer Olympics
Water polo players at the 1972 Summer Olympics
Place of birth missing (living people)